Dorothy Fay (born Dorothy Alice Fay Southworth, April 4, 1915 – November 5, 2003) was an American actress mainly known for her appearances in Western movies.

Early life and career
She was born Dorothy Fay Southworth in Prescott, Arizona, the daughter of Harry T. Southworth and Harriet Fay Fox. Her father was a medical doctor. Fay attended the Caroline Leonetti School, the University of London, and the University of Southern California in Los Angeles, California. She also studied acting at the Royal Academy of Dramatic Art in London.

Career
Fay began her motion picture career in the late 1930s, performing in several B grade westerns. In 1938, she appeared opposite George Houston in  Frontier Scout at Grand National Pictures. She also appeared with Western stars Buck Jones and William Elliott.

Fay made four movies with her husband, country singer and actor Tex Ritter, at Monogram Pictures: Song of the Buckaroo (1938), Sundown on the Prairie (1939), Rollin' Westward (1939) and Rainbow Over the Range (1940). She played a heroine in The Green Archer (1940) and White Eagle (1941), both at Columbia Pictures. Fay also made a few small appearances in other genres, such as the crime drama Missing Daughters (1939). In 1940, she asked Monogram to give her a different part and was loaned to MGM for a small role in The Philadelphia Story, which starred Cary Grant, James Stewart, and Katharine Hepburn. She also appeared as a debutante in the MGM musical Lady Be Good (1941) starring Ann Sothern, Eleanor Powell, Robert Young and Lionel Barrymore.

Later years
Fay married singer/actor Tex Ritter on June 14, 1941; the marriage ended with his death on January 2, 1974. They had two sons, Thomas and John. Among her grandchildren are actors Jason Ritter and Tyler Ritter.

Fay made several more movies after she and Ritter married, but then retired from show business in late 1941. In 1965, she and Ritter moved to Nashville, because of his singing and recording career. For a time, she was an official greeter at the Grand Ole Opry. She returned to Southern California in 1981. Fay turned down several offers to return to movie work, including an opportunity to appear on the ABC television series The Love Boat playing the mother of real-life son, John. But she did appear with him in the TV special "Superstars and their Moms" in 1987.  She was also a frequent guest at western movie conventions.

In 1987, Fay suffered a stroke that impacted her speech. She moved to the Motion Picture & Television Country House and Hospital in Woodland Hills, California, in 1989.  In August 2001, her death was mistakenly reported in the obituary section of The Daily Telegraph in London. This reportedly happened when a nurse at the Motion Picture Hospital returned after a holiday to find her not in her room. When told that she had "gone," as she had, but only to another wing, the nurse promptly called one of Dorothy Fay's friends, who happened to be a regular contributor to the Telegraph obituaries desk. Fay and her family found the blunder amusing and took it in good sport.

Death
Fay died of natural causes at the age of 88 at the Motion Picture and  Television Home in Woodland Hills, California, less than two months after the death of her son, John. She is interred with her parents at Mountain View Cemetery in her hometown of Prescott, Arizona. Tex Ritter is interred at Oak Bluff Memorial Park in Port Neches, Texas. John Ritter is interred at Forest Lawn Memorial Park in Hollywood Hills, California.

Filmography

References

External links

1915 births
2003 deaths
Actresses from Arizona
American film actresses
People from Prescott, Arizona
People from Greater Los Angeles
University of Southern California alumni
Greeters
20th-century American actresses
21st-century American women